V Sport is a group of Norwegian television channels owned by Viaplay Group, and a part of the pan-Nordic V Sport brand.

The channel launched on 17 October 2008, when Viasat re-tooled their sports channels in Norway and Sweden. Together with Viasat Motor, it replaced Viasat Sport 1, 2 and 3 in Norway.

When the channel launched, exclusive highlights on the channel were several football events such as the UEFA Champions League, UEFA Europa League, 2010 World Cup qualifications, the FA Cup and League Cup, as well as Formula One, NFL, boxing, cycling, GET-ligaen, and Ice Hockey World Championship.

In 2017, Viasat Sport in Norway was renamed Viasport, and in 2020, Viasport was renamed V Sport, the common brand for NENT sports channels.

Programming 
V Sport Golf
PGA Tour
LPGA Tour
PGA European Tour
Ryder Cup
Champions Tour
British Open
V Sport +
UEFA Champions League
La Liga
Serie A
French Ligue 1
NFL
NHL
Formula One
Premier League Darts
E-League
ESL One
Mobil 1 The Grid
Trans World Sport
V Sport 1
UEFA Champions League
La Liga
FA Cup
NHL
Formula One
French Ligue 1
V Sport 2
Serie A
EHF Champions League
NHL
La Liga
V Sport 3
MotoGP
NASCAR
Supercars Championship
WRC
Mobil 1 The Grid
Trans World Sport
V Sport Premier League
Premier League

References

Television channels in Norway
Modern Times Group
Television channels and stations established in 2008